

Places
Montgaillard is the name or part of the name of several communes in France:

 Mongaillard, former commune of the Gers, now part of Cazaux-d'Anglès
 Montgailhard, formerly Montgaillard, in the Ariège department
 Montgaillard, Aude, in the Aude department
 Montgaillard, Landes, in the Landes department
 Montgaillard, Hautes-Pyrénées, in the Hautes-Pyrénées department
 Montgaillard, Tarn, in the Tarn department
 Montgaillard, Tarn-et-Garonne, in the Tarn-et-Garonne department
 Montgaillard-de-Salies, in the Haute-Garonne department
 Montgaillard-en-Albret, in the Lot-et-Garonne department
 Montgaillard-Lauragais, in the Haute-Garonne department
 Montgaillard-sur-Save, in the Haute-Garonne department

People
 Jean Gabriel Maurice Rocques, comte de Montgaillard, (November 16, 1761 – February 8, 1841) was a French political agent of the Revolution and First Empire era.

oc:Montgalhard (Arièja)